Marcelino Jr Carreazo Betin (born 17 December 1999), is a Colombian footballer of Venezuelan descent who plays as a winger for the Bulgarian football club CSKA Sofia.

Career statistics

Club

References

External links

1999 births
Living people
Colombian footballers
Colombian people of Venezuelan descent
Association football midfielders
Once Caldas footballers
PFC CSKA Sofia players
Categoría Primera A players
First Professional Football League (Bulgaria) players
Colombian expatriate footballers
Expatriate footballers in Bulgaria